Bobbili Simham is a 1994 Telugu-language action drama film, produced by Trivikram Rao under the Vijayalakshmi Art Pictures banner and directed by A. Kodandarami Reddy. It stars Nandamuri Balakrishna, Meena and Roja, with music composed by M. M. Keeravani. The film was recorded as a Super Hit at the box office.       Roja's performance as a scheming wife suffering from Blood cancer in this film is considered one of her career's best. She portrayed the sacrificing character with grey shades flawlessly.

Plot
The film begins at the terrain of Bobbili where Vijaya Raghava Bhupathi is its heir. In his childhood, he is guarded by his maternal uncle Rayudu and sacrifices his own to persist their clan. 25 years later, Vijaya Raghava backs rectitude & rebel to crown his authority at Dharma Pettam unbiased judgments, by inquest the issues at a square. Pasupathi a savage begrudged, as the tyranny ruling all these days. So, he obstructs Vijaya Raghava but he acquires by giving a counterstrike to Pasupati. After a while, Venkata Lakshmi a village girl spots Vijaya Raghava at a fair and is infatuated. Bhuvaneswari Devi the grandmother of Vijaya Raghava arouses her intention. In the interim, the wicked try to mess up Venkatalakshmi's life in name of God. To protect her chastity, Vijaya Raghava compelled knit her. Immediately, Venkatalakshmi realizes Vijaya Raghava has already nuptial his cousin Sravani and she is his second spouse when Venkatalakshmi angers when Bhuvaneswari Devi spins backward. 

Vijaya Raghava & Sravani endeared from childhood and their alliance is fixed. During that time, Pasupathi squats the fields of the endowment department by mingling with Minister Basavaiah. Vijaya Raghava shields allocate the lands to the original and scalp Pasupathi. Just as a vengeance, Pasupathi poisons a girl who is taken immediately to Rayudu also an Ayurvedic doctor. They kill her on behalf of Rayudu and as inevitable Vijaya Raghava penalizes him. As well as, the malice artifices and schemes Sravani espouses with Pasupathi’s elder son Gajendra. Vijaya Raghava crashes the ploy and weds Sravani. On the first night, Sravani becomes furious and says that she has married him to seek avenge. Aside, she will destroy their races rescued by her father without consummating with him. Overhearing it, Bhuvaneswari Devi challenges Sravani to get an heir by coupling another with Vijaya Raghava which is why she does all of this. 

Therefrom, the game starts, and the two wives. However, Vijaya Raghava keeps Venkata Lakshmi far away but existing conditions make them unite. Besides, Vijaya Raghava learns that she has a sibling Ganga, the progeny of his father’s second female Saraswathi. Further, she is in love with Pasupathi’s younger Sivaji. So, he walks with the proposal to Pasupathi who pretends to agree and performs the splice. Anyhow, he intrigues that night Minister Basavaiah attempts to molest Ganga when Vijaya Raghava guards and captives the Minister. Urgently Chief minister its lands at Bobbili who comprehends the status quo and dethrones the Minister. Parallelly, Vijaya Raghava & Rayudu discerns the connived happened with them via Sivaji and join. Now a new dawn arises when Venkata Lakshmi conceives. 

Here as a flabbergast, Sravani turns jollity as she achieved her goal. Indeed, she is terminally ill due to cancer which is why she made this play. All at once, Vijaya Raghava arrives and proclaims that he already knowledges it when the two embrace with sorrow. Later on, the total family is the aware eminence of Sravani and treats her as a deity. Time passes on, and Sravani fights with death to see the successor. Meanwhile, Vijaya Raghava completes the Bobbili project the aspiration of his ancestors which is going to be inaugurated by CM. Wherefore, Pasupathi & Basavaiah cabal to assassinate them. Moreover, Gajendra assaults to demolish their kinship when Sravani keeps Venkata Lakshmi from harm and painfully reaches their husband. At last, Vijaya Raghava ceases the baddies and protects CM. Finally, the movie ends with Sravani happily departing in Vijaya Raghava’s lap blessing the newborn heir.

Cast

 Nandamuri Balakrishna as Vijaya Raghava Bhupathi
 Roja as Krishnaveni
 Meena as Venkatalakshmi
 Satyanarayana as Pashupathi
 Sharada as Bhuvaneswari Devi
 Jaggayya as CM
 Sarath Babu as Rayudu
 Kota Srinivasa Rao as Minister Basavaiah
 Mohan Raj as Gajendra
 Mahesh Anand as Rowdy
 Brahmanandam as Papaiah
 Tanikella Bharani as Collector Mahalingam
 Rallapalli as Kanakaiah
 J. V. Somayajulu as Priest
 Sivaji Raja as Sivaji 
 Chalapathi Rao as priest
 Gokina Rama Rao as Ranganna
 Ramaraju as Police Inspector
 Ananth as Villager
 Chitti Babu as Book Seller
 Ironleg Sastri as Villager
 Sangeetha as Saraswathi 
 Sudha as Rayudu's Wife
 Madhurima as Ganga
 Pakhija as Villager
 Anitha as Principal

Soundtrack

Music composed by M. M. Keeravani. Music released on Akash Audio Company.

References

External links
 

Films directed by A. Kodandarami Reddy
Films scored by M. M. Keeravani
Indian action drama films
1990s masala films
1990s Telugu-language films
1990s action drama films